This topic covers notable events and articles related to 2012 in music. This year was the peak of music downloads sales in the United States, with sales declining year on year since then.

Specific locations
2012 in African music
2012 in American music
2012 in Asian music
2012 in Australian music
2012 in British music
2012 in Canadian music
2012 in Chinese music
2012 in European music (Continental Europe)
2012 in French music
2012 in German music
2012 in Irish music
2012 in Japanese music
2012 in Norwegian music
2012 in South Korean music
2012 in Swedish music
2012 in Taiwanese music

Specific genres 
2012 in alternative music
2012 in classical music
2012 in country music
2012 in heavy metal music
2012 in hip hop music
2012 in jazz
2012 in Latin music
2012 in opera
2012 in rock music

Albums released

Classical music
Hans Abrahamsen – String Quartet No. 4
John Adams – Absolute Jest, for string quartet and orchestra
Harrison Birtwistle – The Moth Requiem, for twelve female voices, three harps and alto flute
Elliott Carter
Dialogues II, for piano and chamber orchestra
Epigrams, for violin, cello, and piano
Instances, for chamber orchestra
Unsuk Chin – cosmigimmicks. A musical pantomime for seven instrumentalists
Peter Maxwell Davies – Symphony No. 9
Clemens Gadenstätter
Bersten/Platzen (Paramyth 4), for cello and piano
Haüten/Paramyth 1, for string quartet
Sad Songs, for quartet with saxophone, electric guitar, percussion, piano and integrated electronics
Magnus Lindberg – Acequia Madre, for clarinet and piano
Bruno Mantovani – Concerto pour deux pianos, for two pianos and orchestra
Tristan Murail
The Bronze Age, for flute, clarinet, trombone, violin, cello and piano
Le Désenchantement du Monde, piano concerto
Matthias Pintscher
Bereshit, for large ensemble
Uriel, for cello and piano
Alberto Posadas - Sombras, for soprano, clarinet and string quartet
Eva Reiter – Irrlicht, for ensemble and electronics
Kaija Saariaho
Circle Map, for orchestra and electronics
Duft, for clarinet
Sombre, for voice, bass flute, percussion, harp, and double bass
Erkki-Sven Tüür – String Quartet No. 2 Lost Prayers
Pēteris Vasks – Cello concerto No. 2 Klātbūtne ('Presence')

Opera
George Benjamin - Written on Skin

Deaths

January
 3 – Daniel Peil (69), American rock singer (The Corporation)
 4 – Totti Bergh (76), Norwegian jazz saxophonist.
 Ruthilde Boesch (94), Austrian soprano.
 John Levy (99), American jazz upright-bassist.
 26 – Clare Fischer (83), American jazz keyboardist, composer, arranger and bandleader.

February
11 – Whitney Houston (48), American pop/R&B singer.
 22 – Eivin One Pedersen (55), Norwegian jazz accordionist and pianist.
 25 – Red Holloway (84), American jazz tenor saxophonist. 

March
 1 – Lucio Dalla (68), Italian jazz singer, clarinetist and actor.
 3 – Frank Marocco (81), American jazz piano-accordionist, arranger and composer.
 6 – Robert B. Sherman, 86, American songwriter, and brother of Richard M. Sherman (Sherman Brothers)
 15 – Edvard Hagerup Bull (89), Norwegian composer.

May

 4 - Adam Yauch (47), American rapper (Beastie Boys)

 10 – Bernardo Sassetti (41), Portuguese jazz pianist and composer.
 13 – Trond Bråthen alias "Trondr Nefas" (35), Norwegian singer and guitarist of the black metal band Urgehal
 14 – Belita Woods (63), American R&B singer (Brainstorm)
 30 – Pete Cosey (68), American jazz guitarist.

June
 8 – Wilf Doyle (87), Canadian accordionist
 26 – Harry W. Kvebæk (87), Norwegian classical trumpeter and academic.

July
 7 – Alf Pearson (102), British singer and variety performer (Bob and Alf Pearson)
 27 – Darryl Cotton (62), Australian pop-rock singer-songwriter (Zoot, Cotton, Lloyd & Christian)

August
 11 – Von Freeman (88), American jazz saxophonist.

September
 26 – Marty Fortson (67), American rock and roll singer (The Rivieras)
 29 – Johnny Sanders (66), American rock guitarist (The Gants)

October
 8 – John Tchicai (76), Danish jazz saxophonist and composer.
 26 – Louis Nunley (81), American pop singer (The Anita Kerr Quartet)
November
 3
Anne-Lise Berntsen (69), Norwegian soprano singer.
Odd Børretzen (85), Norwegian author and folk singer (pneumonia).
 15 – Frode Thingnæs (72), Norwegian jazz trombonist and bandleader (complications from a heart attack).

December
 5 – Dave Brubeck (91), American jazz pianist and composer.

See also 

 List of Single Top 100 number-one singles of 2012
 Timeline of musical events
 Women in music
 2012 in television

References 

 
2012-related lists
Music by year